The Merced Bears were a minor league baseball team in the Class C California League in 1941. Bears is also the name of the athletic teams of Merced High School.

External links
Baseball Reference

Baseball teams established in 1941
Baseball teams disestablished in 1941
Defunct California League teams
Professional baseball teams in California
Defunct baseball teams in California
1941 establishments in California
1941 disestablishments in California
Merced, California